Greenfield is a city in Greene County, Illinois, United States. The population was 1,071 at the 2010 census.

Geography
Greenfield is located in eastern Greene County at  (39.342969, -90.209798). Illinois Route 267 passes through the city, leading north  to Jacksonville and south  to Medora.

Demographics

As of the census of 2000, there were 1,179 people, 500 households, and 330 families residing in the city. The racial makeup of the city was 99.24% White, 0.08% African American, 0.42% Native American, and 0.25% from two or more races. Hispanic or Latino of any race were 0.42% of the population.

There were 500 households, out of which 30.8% had children under the age of 18 living with them, 50.0% were married couples living together, 12.0% had a female householder with no husband present, and 33.8% were non-families. 31.6% of all households were made up of individuals, and 19.6% had someone living alone who was 65 years of age or older. The average household size was 2.36 and the average family size was 2.95.

In the city, the population was spread out, with 24.5% under the age of 18, 9.8% from 18 to 24, 25.3% from 25 to 44, 19.8% from 45 to 64, and 20.7% who were 65 years of age or older. The median age was 39 years. For every 100 females, there were 87.4 males. For every 100 females age 18 and over, there were 79.1 males.

The median income for a household in the city was $30,833, and the median income for a family was $36,908. Males had a median income of $27,961 versus $22,216 for females. The per capita income for the city was $16,386. About 10.0% of families and 10.2% of the population were below the poverty line, including 12.2% of those under age 18 and 7.5% of those age 65 or over.

Education
Greenfield is served by its own school district, Greenfield Community Unit School District Number 10. Greenfield CUSD 10 serves portions of Greene, Jersey, Macoupin and Morgan Counties. Schools include Greenfield High School and Greenfield Elementary School.

References

External links
Greenfield Public Schools
Greenfield Public Library

Cities in Illinois
Cities in Greene County, Illinois